Blue Orange Games is a board game company based in San Francisco, California. They have been publishing and promoting award-winning games for over 18 years. The company was founded in 1999 by Thierry Denoual and Juilen Mayot. The company is known to use recyclable materials in its games. It has won numerous awards.

History 
The first Blue Orange Games to be designed was, Gobblet. The creators were hit with a flash of inspiration for the game while in a coffee shop in California. This game was an instant success all over the US and helped build up the company. A San Francisco Chronicle review prompted the game to sell out locally. Co-founder Mayot took a three month road trip across the country, covering 22,000 miles and visiting 500 stores with a jeep packed with 1,000 Gobblet games. The trip and the subsequent 10,000 games sale marked the official start of the business.

The name Blue Orange Games comes from a poem by Paul Eluard titled The Earth is Blue Like an Orange. The company is known for its tree planting campaign and commitment to environmental responsibility. The games are typically made out of wood, tin, resin and recycled or recyclable materials. Blue Orange Games released the best-selling game, Spot It!, in 2010, and it has since maintained its position in the top 100 of the toys & games category on Amazon.com. Spot it! is now available in many different editions and has a Major League Baseball license and a National Hockey League license.

Part of the company's philosophy is a belief in the social and developmental benefits of playing offline games instead of spending time engaged with electronic devices.

Awards 
The company has won notable industry awards for the management of their business. In 2011, Toy Collection and Learning Express presented Blue Orange Games with their Vendor Award and The American Specialty Retailer Association named Blue Orange Games Vendor of the Year in June 2012. A large part of their success has been attributed to their style of business and good relationships with retailers.

Blue Orange groups 
Blue Orange has 3 main divisions:
 Blue Orange Edition (France), the engineering/consulting firm of the group. Three project managers of Blue Orange Edition "look for the playful pearls of tomorrow". They are connected with the authors of games around the world and test more than 1,000 games a year.
 Blue Orange Games (United States), the distributor of Blue Orange's games in the United States, Canada, Australia and New Zealand.
 Blue Orange Europe (France), which approves, validates and distributes Blue Orange's games in the rest of the world.

Blue Orange's games are sold on 5 continents and in 59 different countries.

Products
Blue Orange Games products include:

 Gobblet
 Gobblet Gobblers
 Pengoloo
 Tell Tale
 Fastrack
 Double Shutter
 Yamslam
 Go Go Gelatos
 Bluff You
 Bendomino
 Dr. Eureka
 Zimmbos
 Dr. Microbe
 Brix
 Photosynthesis
 Kingdomino
 Fantastic Park
 Vikings on Board
 Bao Bab
Sushi Draft
Battle Sheep

References

Board game publishing companies
Companies based in San Francisco
2000 establishments in California